Paras Healthcare Pvt. Ltd. is a chain of hospitals providing specialized tertiary medical care. The first Paras Hospital was opened in Gurgaon in 2006. Over the years, the healthcare organization has set up its specialty centers in Chandigarh, Panchkula, Darbhanga, and Patna with a total of 730 beds.

The healthcare organization was founded by Dr. Dharminder Nagar. The regime is broadly categorized into Paras Hospitals and Paras Bliss both dealing in respective specialized medical facilities. Paras Healthcare announced the appointment of Puneet Srivastava as its vice president effective June 3, 2019.

Paras Hospitals in Gurgaon, Patna, and Darbhanga provide multispecialty tertiary care, and Paras Bliss in Panchkula and New Delhi provide specialized mother and child care.

The organization is set to expand the number of health care units in the country. With new centers to be announced in Uttar Pradesh.

Hospital Networks 
NABH accredited

 Paras Hospitals Gurugram
 Paras HMRI Hospital Patna
 Paras Hospitals Panchkula
 Paras JK Hospital Udaipur

Unaccredited

 Paras Global Hospital Darbhanga
 Paras HEC Hospital Ranchi

Medical Treatments 
The key specialties that are mainly focused in all units are - cancer care, neurology, neurosurgery, orthopedics & joint replacement, urology, nephrology, kidney transplant, cardiology, cardiac sciences, gastroenterology & GI surgery, general & lap surgery along plastic surgery. Approximately every unit has at least 30 specialties and super specialties.

Cancer Care Center
In May 2019, Managing Director Dr. Dharminder Nagar inaugurated a Free Cancer Care Center in Patna.

Accomplishments 
Paras HMRI Hospital, Patna achieves an AO Fellowship accreditation by Switzerland-based Association for the Study of Internal Fixation.

References 

2006 establishments in Haryana
Hospitals in Haryana
Hospital networks in India